The 1929 Colorado Agricultural Aggies football team represented Colorado Agricultural College (now known as Colorado State University) in the Rocky Mountain Conference (RMC) during the 1929 college football season.  In their 20th season under head coach Harry W. Hughes, the Aggies compiled a 5–4 record (4–4 against conference opponents), finished eighth in the RMC, and outscored all opponents by a total of 117 to 87.

Schedule

References

Colorado Agricultural
Colorado State Rams football seasons
Colorado Agricultural Aggies football